Honório Gurgel is a neighborhood Lower-class area located in the North Zone of Rio de Janeiro, Brazil.  It borders the Rio de Janeiro neighborhoods of Rocha Miranda, Marechal Hermes, Bento Ribeiro, Coelho Neto, Barros Filho, and Guanabara.

History
The railway station Honório Gurgel was inaugurated in 1905 with the name of Munguengue.  It took its current name, which has existed since the 1920s, on honour of a former mayor of the municipality of Rio de Janeiro.

Honório Gurgel is part of the XV Administrative Region (Madureira) of the city of Rio de Janeiro.

Famous Brazilian singer Anitta and singer Gabriel Diks were raised in the neighborhood.

References

Neighbourhoods in Rio de Janeiro (city)